Víctor Hugo Lorenzón (born 22 May 1977) is an Argentine retired football player. He also holds Italian citizenship.

References

External links
 Víctor Hugo Lorenzón at BDFA.com.ar 
 Víctor Hugo Lorenzón – Argentine Primera statistics at Fútbol XXI 

1977 births
Living people
Footballers from Buenos Aires
Argentine footballers
Club Atlético Platense footballers
Defensores de Belgrano footballers
The Strongest players
S.D. Quito footballers
Fortuna Düsseldorf players
Argentine expatriate sportspeople in Germany
Rot-Weiss Essen players
Argentine expatriate sportspeople in Bolivia
FC Carl Zeiss Jena players
Wuppertaler SV players
2. Bundesliga players
3. Liga players
Expatriate footballers in Bolivia
Expatriate footballers in Ecuador
Expatriate footballers in Chile
Expatriate footballers in Germany
Argentine expatriate sportspeople in Chile
Provincial Osorno footballers
Argentine expatriate sportspeople in Ecuador
Association football defenders